Enrico Nicolini (born 16 January 1955) is an Italian professional former footballer and manager. He currently assists CFR Cluj coach Andrea Mandorlini.

Playing career
Nicolini grew up in U.C. Sampdoria youth team and made his debut in Serie A in 1972. He won a promotion in Serie A with Catanzaro in 1978.

He collected 237 matches in Serie A, scoring 25 goals, and 155 matches in Serie B, scoring 9 goals.

Coaching career
Nicolini started a career as coach in 1990, managing Novara in Serie C2.

Later he assisted Carlo Mazzone during his work at Brescia and then joined Andrea Mandorlini's staff at CFR Cluj in Romania.

References

1955 births
Living people
Footballers from Genoa
Association football midfielders
Italian footballers
Serie A players
Italian football managers
U.C. Sampdoria players
Bologna F.C. 1909 players
U.S. Catanzaro 1929 players
S.S.C. Napoli players
Ascoli Calcio 1898 F.C. players
Novara F.C. managers
U.S. Catanzaro 1929 managers
Palermo F.C. managers
A.C.N. Siena 1904 managers
U.S. Alessandria Calcio 1912 managers
Ascoli Calcio 1898 F.C. managers